was the 9th shōgun of the Ashikaga shogunate who reigned from 1473 to 1489 during the Muromachi period of Japan. Yoshihisa was the son of the eighth shōgun Ashikaga Yoshimasa with his wife Hino Tomiko.

Since the almost 30-year-old shōgun Yoshimasa had no heir by 1464, he adopted his younger brother Ashikaga Yoshimi to succeed him. However, Yoshihisa was born in the next year starting a struggle for succession between brothers that erupted into the Ōnin War starting in 1467, beginning the Sengoku period of Japanese history. In the middle of hostilities, Yoshimasa retired in 1473, relinquishing the position of Sei-i Taishōgun to Yoshihisa.

Events of Yoshihisa's bakufu
Yoshihisa's shogunal administration begins in 1479. The Kaga Rebellion occurs in 1488 in Kaga Province during his reign. The next year, Yoshihisa dies in camp during campaign against Sasaki Takayori; Yoshimasa resumes administration but dies the next year.

After the Ōnin war, Rokkaku Takayori, daimyō of southern Ōmi Province, seized land and manors owned by nobles of the imperial court, temples, and shrines. In 1487, Yoshihisa led a campaign (Rokkaku Tobatsu) against Takayori but died unexpectedly, leaving no heir. Yoshihisa was followed by his cousin, tenth shōgun Ashikaga Yoshitane, the following year.

Family 
 Father: Ashikaga Yoshimasa
 Mother: Hino Tomiko
 Wife: Shōun'in, daughter of Hino Katsumitsu
 Concubine: daughter of Tokudaiji priest
 Child: a daughter

Eras of Yoshihisa's bakufu
The years in which Yoshihisa was shōgun are more specifically identified by more than one era name or nengō.
 Bunmei (1469–1487)
 Chōkyō (1487–1489)

Notes

References
 Ackroyd, Joyce. (1982) Lessons from History: The Tokushi Yoron. Brisbane: University of Queensland Press.  ; OCLC 7574544
 Titsingh, Isaac. (1834). Nihon Ōdai Ichiran; ou, Annales des empereurs du Japon.  Paris: Royal Asiatic Society, Oriental Translation Fund of Great Britain and Ireland. OCLC 5850691.

Yoshihisa
1465 births
1489 deaths
15th-century shōguns
Yoshihisa
People of Muromachi-period Japan
1470s in Japan
1480s in Japan
15th-century Japanese people